Damir Buljević (born 22 September 1965) is a Croatian former professional tennis player of the 1980s and 1990s. He is a dual German-Croatian citizen.

Born in Split, Buljević moved to Germany due to the war and has remained there since. During his career he was a Davis Cup squad member for both the Yugoslav and Croatian national teams. He was a semi-finalist at the 1988 Heilbronn Challenger and in 1990 made the second round at the ATP Tour's Umag Open, where he fell to Eric Jelen in a third set tiebreak. In 1992 he won Germany's national outdoor championships.

References

External links
 
 

1965 births
Living people
Yugoslav male tennis players
Croatian male tennis players
Croatian emigrants to Germany
Tennis players from Split, Croatia